Screwball comedy is a film subgenre of the romantic comedy genre that became popular during the Great Depression, beginning in the early 1930s and thriving until the early 1940s, that satirizes the traditional love story. It has secondary characteristics similar to film noir, distinguished by a female character who dominates the relationship with the male central character, whose masculinity is challenged. The two engage in a humorous battle of the sexes, which was a new theme for Hollywood and audiences at the time.

The genre also featured romantic attachments between members of different social classes, as in It Happened One Night (1934) and My Man Godfrey (1936).
  
What sets the screwball comedy apart from the generic romantic comedy is that "screwball comedy puts the emphasis on a funny spoofing of love, while the more traditional romantic comedy ultimately accents love". Other elements of the screwball comedy include fast-paced, overlapping repartee, farcical situations, escapist themes, physical battle of the sexes, disguise and masquerade, and plot lines involving courtship and marriage. Some comic plays are also described as screwball comedies.

History
Screwball comedy has proved to be a popular and enduring film genre. It Happened One Night (1934) is often credited as the first true screwball, though Bombshell starring Jean Harlow preceded it by a year. Although many film scholars agree that its classic period had effectively ended by 1942, elements of the genre have persisted or have been paid homage to in later films. Other film scholars argue that the screwball comedy lives on.

During the Great Depression, there was a general demand for films with a strong social class critique and hopeful, escapist-oriented themes. The screwball format arose largely as a result of the major film studios' desire to avoid censorship by the increasingly enforced Hays Code. In order to incorporate prohibited risqué elements into their plots, filmmakers resorted to handling these elements covertly. Verbal sparring between the sexes served as a stand-in for physical, sexual tension. Though some film scholars, such as William K. Everson, argue that "screwball comedies were not so much rebelling against the Production Code as they were attacking and ridiculing the dull, lifeless respectability that the Code insisted on for family viewing".

The screwball comedy has close links with the theatrical genre of farce, and some comic plays are also described as screwball comedies. Other genres with which screwball comedy is associated include slapstick, situation comedy, romantic comedy and bedroom farce.

Characteristics

Films definitive of the genre usually feature farcical situations, a combination of slapstick with fast-paced repartee and show the struggle between economic classes. They also generally feature a self-confident and often stubborn central female protagonist and a plot involving courtship and marriage or remarriage. These traits can be seen in both It Happened One Night and My Man Godfrey (1936). The film critic Andrew Sarris has defined the screwball comedy as "a sex comedy without the sex."

Like farce, screwball comedies often involve masquerade and disguise in which a character or characters resort to secrecy. Sometimes screwball comedies feature male characters cross-dressing, further contributing to elements of masquerade (Bringing Up Baby (1938), I Was a Male War Bride (1949), and Some Like It Hot (1959)). At first, the couple seem mismatched and even hostile to each other but eventually overcome their differences in an amusing or entertaining way that leads to romance. Often this mismatch comes about when the man is of a lower social class than the woman (Bringing Up Baby and Holiday, both 1938). The final romantic union is often planned by the woman from the outset, and the man is seemingly oblivious to this. In Bringing Up Baby, the woman says to a third party: "He's the man I'm going to marry. He doesn't know it, but I am."

These pictures also offered a kind of cultural escape valve: a safe battleground on which to explore serious issues such as class under a comedic and non-threatening framework. Class issues are a strong component of screwball comedies: the upper class are represented as idle, pampered, and having difficulty coping with the real world. By contrast, when lower-class people attempt to pass themselves off as upper class or otherwise insinuate themselves into high society, they are able to do so with relative ease (The Lady Eve, 1941; My Man Godfrey, 1936). Some critics believe that the portrayal of the upper class in It Happened One Night was brought about by the Great Depression, and the financially struggling moviegoing public's desire to see the rich upper class taught a lesson in humanity.

Another common element of the screwball comedy is fast-talking, witty repartee, such as in You Can't Take It with You (1937) and His Girl Friday (1940). This stylistic device did not originate in the genre: it is also found in many of the old Hollywood cycles, including gangster films and romantic comedies.

Screwball comedies also tend to contain ridiculous, farcical situations, such as in Bringing Up Baby, where a couple must take care of a pet leopard during much of the film. Slapstick elements are also frequently present, such as the numerous pratfalls Henry Fonda takes in The Lady Eve (1941).

One subgenre of screwball is known as the comedy of remarriage, in which characters divorce and then remarry one another (The Awful Truth (1937), The Philadelphia Story (1940)). Some scholars point to this frequent device as evidence of the shift in the American moral code, as it showed freer attitudes toward divorce (though the divorce always turns out to have been a mistake).

Another subgenre of screwball comedy has the woman chasing a man who is oblivious to or not interested in her. Examples include Barbara Stanwyck chasing Henry Fonda (The Lady Eve, 1941); Sonja Henie chasing John Payne (Sun Valley Serenade, 1941, and Iceland, 1942); Marion Davies chasing Antonio Moreno (The Cardboard Lover, 1928); Marion Davies chasing Bing Crosby (Going Hollywood, 1933); and Carole Lombard chasing William Powell (My Man Godfrey, 1936).

The philosopher Stanley Cavell has noted that many classic screwball comedies turn on an interlude in the state of Connecticut (Bringing Up Baby, The Lady Eve, The Awful Truth). In Christmas in Connecticut (1945), the action moves to Connecticut and remains there for the duration of the film.

Examples from the classic period

 The Patsy (1928), directed by King Vidor, starring Marion Davies, Marie Dressler, and Lawrence Gray
 The Front Page (1931) (remade as His Girl Friday), directed by Lewis Milestone, starring Adolphe Menjou and Pat O'Brien
 Trouble in Paradise (1932), directed by Ernst Lubitsch, starring Miriam Hopkins, Kay Francis, and Herbert Marshall
 It Happened One Night (1934), directed by Frank Capra, starring Clark Gable and Claudette Colbert
 Twentieth Century (1934), directed by Howard Hawks, starring John Barrymore and Carole Lombard
 My Man Godfrey (1936), directed by Gregory La Cava, starring William Powell and Carole Lombard
 Cain and Mabel (1936), directed by Lloyd Bacon, starring Marion Davies and Clark Gable
 Libeled Lady (1936), directed by Jack Conway, starring Jean Harlow, William Powell, Myrna Loy, and Spencer Tracy
 Theodora Goes Wild (1936), directed by Richard Boleslawski, starring Irene Dunne and Melvyn Douglas
 The Awful Truth (1937), directed by Leo McCarey, starring Irene Dunne and Cary Grant 
 Nothing Sacred (1937), directed by William A. Wellman, starring Carole Lombard and Fredric March
 Bringing Up Baby (1938), directed by Howard Hawks, starring Katharine Hepburn and Cary Grant
Holiday (1938), directed by George Cukor, starring Katharine Hepburn and Cary Grant
 His Girl Friday (1940), directed by Howard Hawks, starring Cary Grant and Rosalind Russell
Primrose Path (1940), directed by Gregory LaCava, starring Joel McCrea, Ginger Rogers, Miles Mander and Marjorie Rambeau
 My Favorite Wife (1940), directed by Garson Kanin, starring Cary Grant and Irene Dunne
 The Philadelphia Story (1940), directed by George Cukor, starring Katharine Hepburn, Cary Grant and James Stewart
 Mr. and Mrs. Smith (1941), directed by Alfred Hitchcock, starring Robert Montgomery and Carole Lombard
 The Lady Eve (1941), directed by Preston Sturges, starring Barbara Stanwyck and Henry Fonda
Ball of Fire (1941), directed by Howard Hawks, starring Barbara Stanwyck and Gary Cooper 
 Unfinished Business (1941), directed by Gregory La Cava, starring Robert Montgomery and Irene Dunne
 The Palm Beach Story (1942), directed by Preston Sturges, starring Claudette Colbert and Joel McCrea
 To Be or Not To Be (1942) directed by Ernst Lubitsch, starring Carole Lombard, Jack Benny, Robert Stack
The More the Merrier (1943), directed by George Stevens, starring Jean Arthur and Joel McCrea
The Miracle of Morgan's Creek (1944), directed by Preston Sturges, starring Betty Hutton and Eddie Bracken

Other films from this period in other genres incorporate elements of the screwball comedy. For example, Alfred Hitchcock's thriller The 39 Steps (1935) features the gimmick of a young couple who finds themselves handcuffed together and who eventually, almost in spite of themselves, fall in love with one another, and Woody Van Dyke's detective comedy The Thin Man (1934), which portrays a witty, urbane couple who trade barbs as they solve mysteries together. Some of the Fred Astaire and Ginger Rogers musicals of the 1930s also feature screwball comedy plots, such as The Gay Divorcee (1934), Top Hat (1935), and Carefree (1938), which costars Ralph Bellamy. The Eddie Cantor musicals Whoopee! (1930) and Roman Scandals (1933), and slapstick road movies such as Six of a Kind (1934) include screwball elements. Some of the Joe E. Brown comedies also fall into this category, particularly Broadminded (1931) and Earthworm Tractors (1936).

Actors and actresses featured in or associated with screwball comedy:

 Jean Arthur
 Fred Astaire
 Ralph Bellamy
 Eric Blore
 Charles Coburn
 Claudette Colbert
 Gary Cooper
 Marion Davies
 William Demarest
 Melvyn Douglas
 Irene Dunne
 Clark Gable
 Cary Grant
 Jean Harlow
 Katharine Hepburn
 Edward Everett Horton
 Harold Lloyd
 Carole Lombard
 Myrna Loy
 Fred MacMurray
 Ray Milland
 William Powell
 Ginger Rogers
 Rosalind Russell
 Barbara Stanwyck
 James Stewart

Directors of screwball comedies:

 Frank Capra
 George Cukor
 Howard Hawks
 Garson Kanin
 Gregory La Cava
 Mitchell Leisen
 Ernst Lubitsch
 Leo McCarey
 Preston Sturges
 W. S. Van Dyke
 Billy Wilder

Later examples

Later films thought to have revived elements of the classic era screwball comedies include:
 Champagne for Caesar (1950), d. Richard Whorf
 The Mating Season (1951), d. Mitchell Leisen
 Monkey Business (1952), d. Howard Hawks*
 How to Marry a Millionaire (1953), d. Jean Negulesco
 The Seven Year Itch (1955), d. Billy Wilder
 Bell, Book and Candle (1958), d. Richard Quine
 Pillow Talk (1959), d. Michael Gordon
 Some Like It Hot (1959), d. Billy Wilder
 The Grass Is Greener (1960), d. Stanley Donen
 Lover Come Back (1961), d. Delbert Mann
 One, Two, Three (1961), d. Billy Wilder
 It's a Mad, Mad, Mad, Mad World (1963), d. Stanley Kramer
 Man's Favorite Sport? (1964), d. Howard Hawks
 Send Me No Flowers (1964), d. Norman Jewison
 Walk, Don't Run (1966), d. Charles Walters
 What's Up, Doc? (1972), d. Peter Bogdanovich
 For Pete's Sake (1974), d. Peter Yates
 Heaven Can Wait (1978), d. Warren Beatty and Buck Henry
 Une Femme ou Deux ( "One Woman or Two"; 1985), d. Daniel Vigne 
 Desperately Seeking Susan (1985), d. Susan Seidelman
 Something Wild (1986), d. Jonathan Demme
 Overboard (1987), d. Garry Marshall
 Raising Arizona (1987), d. Coen Brothers
 Women on the Verge of a Nervous Breakdown (1988), d. Pedro Almodóvar
 Oscar (1991) d. John Landis
 Sólo con Tu Pareja (1991), d. Alfonso Cuarón
 The Hudsucker Proxy (1994), d. Joel Coen
 Flirting With Disaster (1996), d. David O. Russell
 Runaway Bride (1999)
 Little Nicky (2000), d. Steven Brill
 Rat Race (2001), d. Jerry Zucker
 Intolerable Cruelty (2003), d. Coen Brothers
 Anchorman: The Legend of Ron Burgundy (2004), d. Adam McKay
 Miss Pettigrew Lives for a Day (2008), d. Bharat Nalluri
 Our Idiot Brother (2011), d. Jesse Peretz
 While We're Young (2014), d. Noah Baumbach
 Mistress America (2015), d. Noah Baumbach
 She's Funny That Way (2015), d. Peter Bogdanovich
 Hail, Caesar! (2016), d. Coen Brothers
 Chongqing Hot Pot (2016), d. Yang Qing
Elements of classic screwball comedy often found in more recent films which might otherwise simply be classified as romantic comedies include the "battle of the sexes" (Down with Love, How to Lose a Guy in 10 Days), witty repartee (Down with Love), and the contrast between the wealthy and the middle class (You've Got Mail, Two Weeks Notice). Many of Elvis Presley's films from the 1960s had drawn, consciously or unconsciously, the many characteristics of the screwball comedy genre. Some examples are Double Trouble, Tickle Me, Girl Happy and Live A Little, Love A Little. Modern updates on screwball comedy also sometimes are categorized as black comedy (Intolerable Cruelty, which also features a twist on the classic screwball element of divorce and remarriage). The Coen Brothers often include screwball elements in a film which may not otherwise be considered screwball or even a comedy.

The Golmaal movies, a series of Hindi-language Indian films, have been described as a screwball comedy franchise.

Screwball comedy elements in other genres
In his 2008 production of the classic Beaumarchais comedy The Marriage of Figaro, author William James Royce trimmed the five-act play down to three acts and labeled it a "classic screwball comedy". The playwright made Suzanne the central character, endowing her with all the feisty comedic strengths of her classic film counterparts. In his adaptation, entitled One Mad Day! (a play on Beaumarchais' original French title), Royce underscored all of the elements of the classic screwball comedy, suggesting that Beaumarchais may have had a hand in the origins of the genre.

The plot of Corrupting Dr. Nice, a science fiction novel by John Kessel involving time travel, is modeled on films such as The Lady Eve and Bringing Up Baby.

See also
Hawksian woman

References

Further reading
 Screwball Comedy: Defining a Film Genre, Wes D. Gehring, 1983.
 Hollywood Screwball Comedy 1934-1945: Sex, Love, and Democratic Ideals, Grégoire Halbout, 2022.

External links
 Screwball Comedy Primer - Green Cine
 Home of the Screwball - University of Virginia
 Screwball Comedy - film reference
 Screwball Comedy - Everything2
 Screwball Comedy Film: Definition - wordiQ
 Great Directors: Mitchell Leisen - Senses of Cinema
 Head Over Heels - The Guardian
  La Screwball Comedy - CINEMACLASSIC
  Screwball Comedies: Ein enzyklopädischer Artikel - University of Hamburg

Comedy genres
Film genres